In ancient Roman religion, a Bidental was a sacred shrine erected on the spot where lightning had struck.

Creation
Any remains and scorched earth at the spot were to be burned in a hole at the location by priests called bidentales. Any person killed by the bolt was to be buried in the earth where the lightning hit, as opposed to traditional cremation. 

A puteal (wellhead), one or sometimes more, was then placed on the spot of burned earth. In order to further consecrate the site, the officiant would sacrifice a two-year-old sheep (called a bidens). Finally, an altar was built, and surrounded by a wall or fence to keep any trespassers away. Occasionally when falling into a state of decay, Bidentals would be repaired or reconstructed.

Significance 
Considered sacred space, a Bidental was not to be touched, trod upon, or even looked at after completion. 

Places being struck by lightning were regarded as a terrifying example of divine wrath, and not to be taken lightly. Had a person committed sacrilege, they were punished severely with frenzy. Primarily, it was believed that these shows of divine power were displayed specifically by Jupiter, Roman god of the sky and thunder as well as king of the gods.

References
 "The Divine Thunderbolt." Google Books. Web. 21 Nov. 2015.
 "Gentleman's Magazine, and Historical Chronicle." Google Books. Web. 17 Nov. 2015.
 "P996 Bidental." LacusCurtius • Roman Religion. Web. 23 Oct. 2015.
 "The Illustrated Companion to the Latin Dictionary and Greek Lexicon." Internet Archive. 1849. Web. 11 Nov. 2015.

Ancient Roman religious titles
Lightning